Ashby de la Zouch, sometimes hyphenated as Ashby-de-la-Zouch, and shortened locally to Ashby, is a market town and civil parish in the North West Leicestershire district of Leicestershire, England. The town is near to the Derbyshire and Staffordshire borders. Its 2001 census population of 11,410 rose to 12,370 in 2011. The castle in the town was an important fort in the 15th–17th centuries. In the 19th century the town's main industries were ribbon manufacture, coal mining, and brickmaking.

The civil parish includes the hamlets of Shellbrook to the west and Boundary to the north-west. Swadlincote, Burton upon Trent, Melbourne and Coalville are within , with Derby  due north. In 2018, Ashby Market Street was named "Best Shopping Experience", and in 2019 it made the final of the rising-star category for UK high streets.

History

The town was known as Ashby in 1086. This is a word of Anglo-Danish origin, meaning "Ash-tree farm" or "Ash-tree settlement". The Norman French name extension dates from the years after the Norman conquest of England, when Ashby became a possession of the La Zouche family during the reign of Henry III.

Ashby de la Zouch Castle was built in the 12th century. The town and castle came into the possession of the Hastings family in 1464 and William Hastings, 1st Baron Hastings enhanced its fortifications from 1473. In the English Civil War, the town was one of the Cavaliers' chief garrisons under the control of Colonel Henry Hastings, 1st Baron Loughborough and commander of the North Midlands Army. When the town fell after a long siege in March 1646, it was counted a great relief to the surrounding towns and villages.

Many of the buildings in Market Street, the town's main thoroughfare, are timber framed. Most of this structure is hidden by later brick facades. The Bull's Head public house retains its original Elizabethan half-timbering, although most of this was plastered over some years ago and can no longer be seen from the street. A short distance further down Market Street is a shop, currently occupied as a LOROS Charity Shop, which retains its original Elizabethan timbers in full street view. Regency buildings are also standing in this street. Bath Street has a row of Classical-style houses called Rawdon Terrace, dating from the time of the 1820s, when the town was a spa destination.

Notable buildings

Churches

St Helen's Church is Ashby's original Anglican parish church. It is a late 15th-century Perpendicular Gothic building. The outer aisles were designed by J. P. St. Aubyn and added in 1878. St. Helen's contains notable memorials to various members of the Hastings family and other notables. It also holds a rare 300-year-old finger pillory.

Holy Trinity Church is a Gothic Revival building designed by H. I. Stevens in the Early English Gothic style and built in 1838–40. It has galleries supported by iron columns. The chancel was added in 1866 and the ironwork chancel screen in 1891.

The Roman Catholic Church of Our Lady of Lourdes was designed by F. A. Walters and built in 1908–15 at the expense of the 15th Duke of Norfolk. It is neo-Norman, with three apses and a tower at the southeast corner.

The Congregational Church was built in 1825 in a neoclassical style with Tuscan columns. There is also a Christadelphian meeting hall in the town.

Ivanhoe Baths

Unused, it was derelict by 1960, and was demolished in 1962. Here developers built the Moira Baths, with a large hotel nearby for travellers. After a few years, however, it was decided to convey the water to Ashby, where the Ivanhoe Baths were built. The Royal Hotel, originally called the Hastings Hotel, was built in 1826 to accommodate visitors to the growing spa. It has a Doric porte-cochère and additional Doric columns in its hall inside. The hotel closed in February 2018.

Water tower
The Grade II-listed, 19th-century water tower, located in the town's cemetery on Moira Road, has been converted into a dwelling. The conversion was controversial since it involved a number of modern additions to the building.

Loudoun Monument
In 1879, Baron Donington, the widowed husband of Edith Rawdon-Hastings, 10th Countess of Loudoun, had the Loudoun monument erected to her memory in Ashby. The octagonal monument by Sir George Gilbert Scott is based on the Eleanor crosses and is a Listed building. It is located at the junction of Bath and South Streets, opposite the Roman Catholic church.

Ashby-de-la-Zouch Town Hall

Ashby-de-la-Zouch Town Hall, which was built at the same time as the market hall to its rear, dates to 1857.

Education
The town has two secondary schools: 

Ashby School, previously Ashby Grammar School, is for 11–18-year-olds. It was founded in 1567. The town formerly had two other endowed boys' schools founded in the 18th century.

Ivanhoe School, previously Ivanhoe College, is for 11 to 16-year-olds. It was founded in 1954. It is named after the historical novel Ivanhoe by Sir Walter Scott, which he set in the area of the castle. In Scott's novel the town hosts an important archery competition held by Prince John, in which Robin Hood competes and wins.

Manor House School was an independent day school in the centre of Ashby for boys and girls aged four to 16. The school was located between St Helen's Church and the ruins of Ashby's historic castle. Pupils travelled to the school from a wide area. The school entered into administration on 13 December 2018.

Business
In the 19th century Ashby's main industry was leather working. There was also a cotton textile factory and a glue factory. Ashby was surrounded by coalmines but was never a coalmining town itself. By far the largest employer in the town today is United Biscuits, providing about 2,000 jobs at its distribution centre, which stores its products and transports them nationwide, and its KP Snacks factory in Smisby Road. The firm formerly had a larger presence in Ashby. McVitie's biscuit factory on Smisby Road closed in 2004 with the loss of 900 jobs.

Other employers in Ashby include Tesco, Ashfield Commercial & Medical Services, Timeline Communications, Eduteq Limited and TAC UK Ltd, a firm of energy consultants. Standard Soap Ltd, a significant industrial employer within Ashby-de-la-Zouch since 1928, closed in early 2012, resulting in the loss of 155 jobs. The town has a concentration of high-tech employers. The video game software house Ultimate Play the Game, was based in Ashby. Now called Rare, it has moved to Manor Park near Twycross.

Recreation

Ashby United Community Football Club is a community club for juniors and seniors of all ages. They play across multiple divisions across all of their Junior and Senior teams and are seen as leading the way in community inclusion when it comes to football and sports in the town.

Willesley Park Golf Course is set in rolling countryside, partly in parkland and partly on heathland, covering 230 acres of gentle undulating countryside. The course was opened for play in April 1921. The first hole is played along an avenue of lime trees which once flanked the old coach road from the old Norman castle in the town to the now demolished Willesley Hall.

Ashby Hastings Cricket Club was founded before 1831. Its ground, the Bath Grounds in the centre of Ashby, hosts Leicestershire CCC 2nd XI matches each year. The club runs three Saturday League sides, all of which play in the Everard's Leicestershire County Cricket League. The 1st XI play in the Premier Division, the highest level of club cricket available in Leicestershire, the 2nd XI play in Division 4 and the 3rd XI play in Division 8. The club also run a Midweek XI who play in the Premier Division of the Loughborough Cricket Association League and a Sunday XI who play friendly cricket. The club's Junior Section includes sides at Under 15, Under 13, Under 11 and Under 10 age groups. A second club, Ashby Town Cricket Club was formed in 1945.

Ashby RFC has its grounds in Nottingham Road. It plays in the League Midland 3 East (North). It also has mini and junior sections for girls and boys from age four, as well as seniors and seconds side and an O2 Touch team for players of all ages and both genders.

The town also has a bridge club (Ashby Bridge Club), and a hockey club (Ashby Hockey Club)

A greyhound racing track, was opened on 3 April 1931. The racing was independent (not affiliated to the sports governing body the National Greyhound Racing Club) known as a flapping track, which was the nickname given to independent tracks. Racing was held on Tuesday and Saturday evenings and distances included 200, 350, 550 and 525 yards. The date of closure is thought to be around 1935.

Transport
The town was to be served by Ashby Canal from 1804 but the canal never reached Ashby, as it was constructed only to the village of Moira. The town was served by the Leicester–Burton upon Trent line of the Midland Railway and had its own station. After the canal was abandoned in stages between 1944 and 1966, British Railways withdrew the passenger service and closed Ashby de la Zouch railway station in September 1964. The railway remains open for freight. There were also connections to both the Melbourne Line and Ashby and Nuneaton Joint Railway connecting the town with the towns of Melbourne, Market Bosworth, Hinckley and Nuneaton as well as the city of Derby, but these lines closed between the 1950s and 1980s. Both of the lines now form footpaths with some of the old stations still present but others demolished.

In the 1990s BR planned to restore passenger services between Leicester and Burton as the second phase of its Ivanhoe Line project. However, after the privatisation of British Rail in 1995, this phase of the project was shelved. In 2009 the Association of Train Operating Companies published a £49-million proposal to restore passenger services to the line, which would include reopening a station at Ashby.

The fastest train to London in the mornings and evenings is from Tamworth (12 miles from Ashby) to Euston at 1hr 2mins average non-stop at peak hours.

The A50 Leicester to Stoke-on-Trent road and the A453 Birmingham to Nottingham road used to pass through the town centre. The heavy traffic, which previously travelled through the town, has been greatly relieved by the A42 and A511 bypasses, which replace the A453 and A50, respectively.

Bus routes provide an hourly direct service to Burton-upon-Trent, Coalville, East Midlands Airport, Leicester and Swadlincote (Midland Classic 9 and 19, and Arriva Midlands 29, 29A and X29). The National Express coach network is available in Leicester, which has a daily direct service to London.

It provides flights to and from other parts of the UK and Europe. For International travellers Birmingham Airport is 26 miles away (c. 30 mins) and provides international flights

Culture
Every May, Ashby holds an arts festival sponsored by the district council. This features local artists, musicians, songwriters, poets, performers, and story tellers. The multiple sites around the town host exhibitions, musical performances, workshops and talks, and the town centre is decorated with flags and an outdoor gallery.

Ashby Statutes, a travelling funfair, is held every September. Instituted by Royal Statute, it was originally a hiring fair, where domestic servants and farmworkers would be hired for the year. During the fair in the 21st century, Market Street, the main road through the town (the former A50 trunk road), is closed for nearly a week. The traffic is diverted along narrower roads either side of Market Street. Locals call this event "The Statutes".

A song "Ashby de la Zouch (Castle Abbey)", written by Al Hoffman, Milton Drake and Jerry Livingston, was recorded by the Merry Macs in 1946 on Decca No. 18811. It includes the lines "If you wanna smooch and be happy as a pooch, go to Ashby de la Zouch by the sea." (Ashby-de-la-Zouch is close to the centre of England, almost as far from the sea as is possible.) In April 1946 the American jazz bassist and composer Charles Mingus recorded a tune called "Ashby de la Zouch" with his band. The title or choice of song could have been an acknowledgement of guitarist Irving Ashby, who took part in the recording. Ashby-de-la-Zouch is twinned with Pithiviers in north-central France.

Ashby-de-la-Zouch is mentioned in Ivanhoe by Sir Walter Scott as "the lists at Ashby", suggesting that jousting may once have taken place in the town (lists being the barriers through which the respective steeds charge during a joust). The same phrase is used in the original computer game Defender of the Crown, which apparently drew inspiration from Scott's novel.

Notable people

Mark Chadbourn (born 1960), author and screenwriter, was born in Ashby de la Zouch Cottage Hospital and still lives in the area.
Frederick Bailey Deeming (1853–1892), serial killer and Jack The Ripper suspect 
Anthony Gilby (c. 1510–1585), Puritan sage
James Green (born 1944), crime and non-fiction author, lived in the area in the 1970s and 1980s.
Joseph Hall (1574–1656), satirist and bishop, was born in Ashby de la Zouch.
Frank Abney Hastings (1794–1828), British naval officer and Philhellene
Annie Haynes (1864–1929), mystery author
Russell Hoult (born 1972), footballer, was born in Ashby and still lives locally (at Coleorton).
Lara Jones (1975–2010), children's author, was born in Ashby.
Robin Beanland (born 1968), video game music composer, musician and Ivor Novello Award winner.
Grant Kirkhope (born 1962), video game music composer and musician
Niall Mackenzie (born 1961), Grand Prix motorcycle racer, is now retired in Ashby.
James Martin (1933–2013), an IT consultant and author, was born in Ashby de la Zouch.
Dolly Shepherd (1887–1983), aviator, made her return to parachuting from balloons in a display at Ashby, after recovering from a near-fatal accident.
Tim and Chris Stamper (living), brothers who were video game programmers, were known for founding the Ultimate Play the Game and Rareware companies.
Paul Taylor (born 1964), England cricketer, was born in the town.
Bernard Vann (1887–1918), taught at Ashby School, before entering the priesthood and then winning a VC, an MC and a Croix de Guerre as an army officer in the First World War.
Roger Williamson (1948–1973), Formula One driver, born in Ashby de la Zouch. 
Alastair Yates (1952–2018), former presenter on BBC News and BBC World News, went to Manor House School, Ashby; his farming family still live in the town.
Young Knives, band formed in Ashby
Michael Wakelam (1955–2020), molecular biologist, director of the Babraham Institute in Cambridge, England.

In popular culture
Adrian Mole, a fictional diarist created by writer Sue Townsend, was from Leicester and moved to Ashby de la Zouch during his lifetime.
Harry Flashman, Sir Harry Paget Flashman VC, KCB, KCIE is a fictional character created by Thomas Hughes (1822–1896) in the semi-autobiographical Tom Brown's School Days (1857) and later developed by George MacDonald Fraser (1925–2008). Sir Harry, after his inglorious career, retired to his country home, Gandamack Lodge, in Ashby, there to write his memoirs, known to the public as The Flashman Papers.
Ashby de la Zouch is often mentioned by Guz Khan in his show Man Like Mobeen, where some characters who "go on holiday to Ashby de la Zouch" mistakenly say it is in Spain rather than Leicestershire.

Location
Neighbouring communities include Lount, Normanton le Heath, Smisby, Packington, Donisthorpe, Oakthorpe, Moira, Measham and Coleorton.

References

Notes

Citations

Sources

 

There is a very in-depth record of the town written in a book by W. Scott in 1907 entitled "The History of Ashby-de-la-Zouch", and printed by a local Printer called George Brown.  It includes many excellent images.

External links

AshbyTown.org Community website for Ashby de la Zouch helping to promote the town and its businesses
AshbyOnline.co.uk The Online Guide to Ashby de la Zouch and Surrounding Area
A Little Bit About Ashby de la Zouch (includes words of the song Ashby de la Zouch by the sea)

 
Market towns in Leicestershire
Civil parishes in Leicestershire
Towns in Leicestershire
North West Leicestershire District